The Aeromarine PG-1 was an American single-seat pursuit (fighter) and ground attack (PG) biplane developed by the Engineering Division of the United States Army and manufactured by the Aeromarine Plane and Motor Co.

Development and design
The PG-1 was intended to fulfill both ground strafing and aerial defense roles, the contract for construction was won by Aeromarine in May 1921.

Armed with a single 0.5 in (12.7 mm) machine gun as well as a 37 mm Baldwin cannon firing through the propeller hub; the cockpit had  armour. The wings were dissimilar, with a wide-chord upper wing with ailerons, and a closely spaced narrow-chord lower plane with dihedral that placed the tips close to the upper wing. The upper wing was mounted close to the top of the fuselage with a cut-away forward section to accommodate the cockpit, and attached to the lower plane via V-type struts.

Power was to have been provided by the eight-cylinder, water-cooled  Wright K-2 engine but the first two prototypes were fitted with  Packard 1A-1116 units due to delays in clearing the K-2 for flight testing. A third prototype was also built and testing was eventually carried out using both the K-2 and Packard 1A-1237 at McCook Field. Prototype aircraft suffered disappointing performance, high levels of vibration and poor visibility. The aircraft had a tendency to spin when stalled. Development was abandoned in 1922.

Specifications

References

Notes

Bibliography
 
 Green, W. & Swanborough, G. (1994). The Complete Book of Fighters. London: Salamander Books. 

Sesquiplanes
Single-engined tractor aircraft
Aeromarine PG-01
Aeromarine PG-01
PG-1
Aircraft first flown in 1922